The Battle of Fort Smith was a small battle fought in western Arkansas during the American Civil War.

Background
In the wake of the failed Union Camden Expedition, areas of Arkansas lay prone to Confederate raids against Union outposts. One such raid occurred against a Union camp at Massard Prairie on July 27, 1864. Confederate General Richard Gano won a victory there, which encouraged further operations.

Battle
Several days later Gano's superior, General Douglas H. Cooper, led a Confederate division several miles north to Fort Smith.  Cooper's force consisted of Gano's brigade and General Stand Watie's brigade.  Gano took position along the Indian Territory side of the Poteau River while Watie moved up from the south on the Arkansas side.  General John M. Thayer commanded the town's defenses with three brigades.  Watie's men made first contact with the 6th Kansas Cavalry of Colonel William R. Judson's Union brigade.  Judson's men fell back from Fort No. 2 along the Texas Road, alerting the rest of the Union garrison of the Confederate arrival.  Cooper's men began to shell the fort.  Thayer responded by sending forward units from Colonel James M. Williams' brigade, including the 6th Kansas Colored Infantry and two howitzers from the 2nd Kansas Battery.  The Union artillery proved superior and soon drove off the Confederate artillery and the supporting cavalry.  Cooper ordered a withdrawal, leaving snipers behind to cover the retreat.

Aftermath
Cooper took with him approximately $130,000 worth of Union arms and supplies. Thayer maintained control of Fort Smith for the duration of the war.  Fort Smith is preserved within Fort Smith National Historic Site.

Opposing Forces

Union
 District of the Frontier – General John M. Thayer
 1st Brigade – Colonel John Edwards
 2nd Brigade – Colonel James M. Williams
 3rd Brigade – Colonel William R. Judson

Confederate
 District of the Indian Territory – General Douglas Cooper
 Gano's Brigade – General Richard M. Gano
 Watie's Brigade – Colonel Stand Watie

References

Battles of the Trans-Mississippi Theater of the American Civil War
Sebastian County, Arkansas
Battles of the American Civil War in Arkansas
Union victories of the American Civil War
Conflicts in 1864
1864 in Arkansas
July 1864 events